The 1957 Akron Zips football team represented Akron University in the 1957 NCAA College Division football season as a member of the Ohio Athletic Conference. Led by fourth-year head coach Joe McMullen, the Zips played their home games at the Rubber Bowl in Akron, Ohio. They finished the season with a record of 7–1–1 overall and 5–1–1 in OAC play. They were outscored by their opponents 208–87.

Schedule

References

Akron
Akron Zips football seasons
Akron Zips football